Tournon-Saint-Martin is a commune in the Indre department in central France.

Geography
The commune is located in natural region Boischaut Nord in the parc naturel régional de la Brenne.

The commune is located at the limit of Indre-et-Loire departement (région Centre) and Vienne departement (Poitou-Charentes region ).

History 
Tournon-Saint-Martin was an important crossroad. A Roman road crossed it, coming from Argenton-sur-Creuse ( Argentomagus ) and going to Poitiers and Tours, following 'la Creuse' river.

 Ruins of Prinçay Castle (15th century).

Population

See also
 Communes of the Indre department

References

Communes of Indre